Bangladesh Copyright Office national level quasi-judicial organisation responsible for copyright management in Bangladesh and is located in  Dhaka, Bangladesh.

History
After the independence of Bangladesh in 1971 the regional copyright office was made the national copyright office. It is a department under the ministry of culture. It has been criticized for failing to coordinate with the Department of Patents, Designs and Trademarks, both of which are responsible for the protection of intellectual property in Bangladesh. Copyright applications are available on its website.

References

Government agencies of Bangladesh
1971 establishments in Bangladesh
Organisations based in Dhaka
Quasi-judicial bodies
Copyright agencies